The 2008 MTN 8 kicked off on the weekend of 9 August with the first two quarterfinals being played on Saturday and Sunday, and the next round of quarterfinals were played on the weekend of the 16 and 17 August. The first leg of the semifinals took place on 23 and 24 August and the second leg on the weekend of 30 August. The finals were scheduled for 21 September, World Peach Day, but the pitch was waterlogged due to heavy rain over that week. The finals were rescheduled for two days later on 23 September at the ABSA Stadium (Kings Park) in Durban.

Teams
The eight teams that competed in the MTN 8 Wafa Wafa knockout competition are: (listed according to their finishing position in the 2007–08 Premier Soccer League Season.

 1. Supersport United
 2. Ajax Cape Town
 3. Santos
 4. Mamelodi Sundowns
 5. Free State Stars
 6. Kaizer Chiefs
 7. Moroka Swallows
 8. Orlando Pirates

Quarter-finals

Semi-finals

1st Leg

2nd Leg

|}
 Mamelodi Sundowns went through to the finals on aggregate due to their away goals.

Finals

Top scorers

External links
Premier Soccer League
South African Football Association

MTN 8
MTN
2008 domestic association football cups